The year 1874 in archaeology involved some significant events.

Explorations
William Henry Jackson of the Hayden Survey photographs the Mesa Verde cliff dwellings.

Excavations
 Excavation of Eadgils' mound at Gamla Uppsala in Sweden.
 Excavation of Bharhut stupa in India by Alexander Cunningham.
 Excavations of Nineveh by George Smith for the British Museum conclude.

Publications

Finds

Awards

Miscellaneous
 German Archaeological Institute at Athens established.

Births
 March 9: Herbert Maryon, English sculptor, archaeologist and conservator (d. 1965)
 May 9: Howard Carter, English Egyptologist (d. 1939)

Deaths

See also
Ancient Egypt / Egyptology

References

Archaeology
Archaeology by year
Archaeology
Archaeology